Katu most often refers to:
 Katu people, an ethnic group from Laos and Vietnam
 Katu language, spoken by the Katu

Katu may also refer to:
 Katu (Marvel Comics), a Marvel Comics character
 KATU (TV), an American television station in Oregon
 Stacey Katu, Cook Island rugby player